Natasha Firman (born 22 June 1976) is an English racing driver and winner of the inaugural Formula Woman championship in 2004. On the way to that victory, she achieved two wins and four third places out of seven races. She later set new endurance records in the Mazda RX-8.

Firman was born in Holt, Norfolk, and educated at Gresham's School from 1990 to 1994. Her father, Ralph Firman Sr., co-founded the Van Diemen racecar constructor. She is the sister of A1 Team Ireland and former Formula One racing driver Ralph Firman.

References
Natasha Firman Takes Formula Woman Championship Title, 27 July 2004 – accessed June 2007
Interview with Natasha Firman at Racemath.info – accessed May 2010

Living people
English racing drivers
English female racing drivers
People educated at Gresham's School
People from Holt, Norfolk
1976 births